Cássio is a Brazilian masculine given name, and Cassio is an Italian surname. 

Cássio or Cassio may refer to:

People

Given name
 Cássio Alessandro de Souza (born 1986), Brazilian footballer
 Cássio Alves de Barros (born 1970), Brazilian footballer
 Cássio (footballer, born January 1980), Cássio José de Abreu Oliveira, Brazilian football left-back
 Cássio (footballer, born August 1980), Cássio Albuquerque dos Anjos, Brazilian football goalkeeper
 Cássio Petry (born 1978),  Brazilian slalom canoer
 Cássio Motta (born 1960), Brazilian tennis player 
 Cássio (footballer, born 1987), Cássio Ramos, Brazilian football goalkeeper
 Cássio Vargas (born 1983), Brazilian footballer
 Cassio Werneck, Brazilian jiu-jitsu competitor and instructor

Surname
 Nicola Cassio (born 1985), Italian swimmer

Characters
 Michael Cassio, a character in William Shakespeare's tragedy Othello
 General Tagge or Cassio Tagge, an Imperial general in Star Wars: Episode IV - A New Hope

Places in the United Kingdom
Cassiobury, a suburb of Watford, Hertfordshire
 Cassio (or Cashio), an archaic name for the estate of Cassiobury House, a former stately home in Watford
Cassiobury Park, a public park in Watford
Cassiobridge tube station, a planned London Underground station in Watford

See also 
 Casio, a multinational electronic devices manufacturing company
 Casso, an Italian village in the municipality of Erto e Casso
 Cassia (disambiguation)
 Cassie (disambiguation)
 Anthony Casso, an American mobster
 Kassio (disambiguation)

Portuguese masculine given names